Out of the Storm is a lost 1920 American silent drama film directed by William Parke, and starring Barbara Castleton, John Bowers, and Sidney Ainsworth. It is an adaptation of Gertrude Atherton's 1910 novel Tower of Ivory.

Plot
As described in a film magazine, Margaret Hill (Castleton), a singer in a disreputable cafe, attracts the attention of Al Levering (Ainsworth), and he offers to have her voice cultivated. At the end of several years Levering is arrested for embezzlement, and confesses that he stole to give Margaret her chance. While he is serving his sentence Margaret finishes her musical education and tours England, where she meets John Ordham (Bowers), who saved her from drowning in a shipwreck while en route to Europe. Levering escapes from jail and goes to London to claim his protege. To protect Ordham from the wrath of Levering, she tells the Englishman that Levering is her husband. Police pick up the trail of the ex-convict and while he is trying to make his escape he is killed. This leaves nothing in the way of the love between Margaret and Ordham.

Cast
 Barbara Castleton as Margaret Hill  
 John Bowers as John Ordham  
 Sidney Ainsworth as Al Levering  
 Doris Pawn as Mabel Cutting  
 Elinor Hancock as Mrs. Cutting  
 Lawson Butt as Lord Bridgeminster  
 Ashton Dearholt as Walter Driscombe  
 Edythe Chapman as Lady Bridgeminster  
 Carrie Clark Ward as Teddy  
 Lincoln Stedman as Sir Reggie Blanchard 
 Clarissa Selwynne as Lady Rosamond 
 J. Ray Avery

Differences from the book 
In the original text, Tower of Ivory (1910) by Gertrude Atherton, Margaret Hill and John Ordham would meet on a boat and fall in love. However, they become separated due to a shipwreck, and would reunite 5 years later by accident at Hill’s concert. Ordham would then approach Hill and ask for her hand in marriage. This is different from the film, in which Ordham would rescue Hill from the shipwreck, and that event would be the one that sparked their romantic relationship. The director likely made this change to decrease run-time and add a suspenseful sea rescue scene, which proved to be the right idea since that scene in particular was praised by critics.

Critical response 
Out of the Storm (1920) received generally negative feedback from the audience. As the fourth movie out of eleven adapted from a novel, original text’s author Gertrude Atherton is certainly no stranger to adaptations onto the big screen. The plot was praised for its ability to “hold one’s interest by reason of its melodramatic moments, which are punctuated by other scenes that lack reality”, but the largest disappointment was certainly the performance that lead actress Castleton failed to deliver. Critics from the Exhibitors Herald described Castleton’s acting as “unnatural and stilting”, and was the “most unnatural and unempathetic of the entire cast.” They further stated that she “plays it with too much restraint”. This left audiences unsatisfied, considering castleton having “a very good account of herself” in other films. One redeeming factor from critics were that the shipwreck scene was “one of the best shipwreck scenes” to be produced at that time.

References

Bibliography
 Goble, Alan. The Complete Index to Literary Sources in Film. Walter de Gruyter, 1999.

External links

 
Atherton, Gertrude (1910), Tower of Ivory, New York: The Macmillan Company, on the Internet Archive

1920 films
1920 drama films
1920s English-language films
American silent feature films
American black-and-white films
Silent American drama films
Films based on American novels
Films directed by William Parke
Lost American films
Films based on works by Gertrude Atherton
1920 lost films
Lost drama films
1920s American films